Colobanthus quitensis, the Antarctic pearlwort, is one of two native flowering plants found in the Antarctic region. It has yellow flowers and grows about 5 cm (two inches) tall, with a cushion-like growth habit that gives it a moss-like appearance.

Distribution
It is found on the west coast of the Antarctic Peninsula, on South Georgia, South Shetland and the Falklands; also in the Andes, becoming increasingly rare northwards, but reaching Bolivia, Peru and Ecuador, with a further isolated population in Mexico.

Climate change
Within Antarctica, due to climate change, more seeds are germinating, creating a large number of seedlings and plants.  Reports indicate a fivefold increase in these plants, which have extended their ranges southward and cover more extensive areas, wherever found. Research found that the Antarctic pearlwort spread nearly ten times faster during the period 2009 through 2018 compared to between 1960 and 2009. Deschampsia antarctica (Antarctic hairgrass) is the only other native flowering plant in the region.

References

External links
 
 
 British Antarctic Survey - Plants
 Pearlwort & Hairgrass picture

quitensis
Flora of Antarctica
Flora of South Georgia Island
Flora of the Falkland Islands
Flora of South America
Flora of Mexico
Plants described in 1823